"Rock and Roll Dreams Come Through" is a song written by American composer Jim Steinman. It was first featured on Steinman's 1981 solo album Bad for Good, with lead vocals by an uncredited Rory Dodd. It was later recorded by American singer Meat Loaf and released in 1994 as the third single from the album Bat Out of Hell II: Back into Hell.

Both the Steinman original and the Meat Loaf remake were top-40 hits. Steinman's version hit number 32 on the US Billboard Hot 100, number 14 on the Billboard Rock Top Tracks chart and number 29 on the Cash Box Top 100; it is Steinman's lone top-40 hit as an artist. In New Zealand, the song spent two weeks at number six and was the 46th biggest hit of 1981. The Meat Loaf version reached number 11 on the UK Singles Chart, number 13 on the Billboard Hot 100 and number four on Canada's RPM Top Singles chart in early 1994.

Music and lyrics
"Rock and Roll Dreams Come Through" is a paean to rock music, celebrating how it is always there to help you through troubled times. One of its lyrics is "You're never alone, 'cause you can put on the 'phones and let the drummer tell your heart what to do."

Music videos

Jim Steinman version
The Steinman version's video features an empty, dark stage with two dancers, one male and one female, both in dancing suits and dancing performance art with a prop electric guitar. Steinman is seen throughout in a dark suit and aviator sunglasses standing still on a platform and lip synching the song. Scenes of a black bird of prey are seen at the beginning and end of the video.

Meat Loaf version
The video for the Meat Loaf version was directed by Michael Bay, who had also directed the videos for "I'd Do Anything for Love (But I Won't Do That)" and "Objects in the Rear View Mirror May Appear Closer than They Are".

In the music video, Meat Loaf stands as a fortuneteller who comforts a recently runaway teenager (played by  Angelina Jolie). Meat Loaf's character also protects a young boy from joining a gang and other people who are lost and lonely.  Jolie's character, after the song ends, returns to her family.

Release
Several versions of the "Rock and Roll Dreams Come Through" have been released. The European and UK version included live versions of "Heaven Can Wait" and "Paradise by the Dashboard Light". A second UK version had "Wasted Youth" and "I'd Do Anything for Love (But I Won't Do That)", while the 7" picture disc contains  just "Wasted Youth". The US singles contained edited, live and acoustic versions of "I'd Do Anything for Love (But I Won't Do That)".

Live variations
The song has been performed live various times since the release of Bat Out of Hell II: Back into Hell. The song was featured on Live Around the World and a live soundcheck appeared on the MAXI single. It was performed with the Melbourne Symphony Orchestra in 2004 as a sound test, but was not in the actual concert (Its audio can be heard on a special edition of the Bat Out of Hell Live CD). It was showcased in the DVD 3 Bats Live with performance by Meat Loaf in London, Ontario in 2007. It can also be found on the special two-CD edition of Bat Out of Hell II and most recently on the live album Casa De Carne, a bonus CD with the Special Edition (US) Deluxe and Super Deluxe versions (UK) of Meat Loaf's 2010 album Hang Cool Teddy Bear.

Charts

Jim Steinman version

Weekly charts

Year-end charts

Meat Loaf version

Weekly charts

Year-end charts

Release history

References

External links
 

Meat Loaf songs
1981 singles
1981 songs
1993 singles
Epic Records singles
MCA Records singles
Music videos directed by Michael Bay
Song recordings produced by Jim Steinman
Songs about rock music
Songs written by Jim Steinman
Virgin Records singles